A Bad Moms Christmas is a 2017 American Christmas comedy film written and directed by Jon Lucas and Scott Moore. It is a sequel to the 2016 film Bad Moms. The plot follows the three moms from the first film (Mila Kunis, Kristen Bell, and Kathryn Hahn) dealing with their own mothers (Christine Baranski, Cheryl Hines, and Susan Sarandon) visiting during the Christmas holiday.

The film was released in the United States on November 1, 2017 and grossed over $130 million. It received mixed reviews, with criticism aimed at the thin story and raunchiness. In April 2019, it was announced that a sequel was in development.

Plot
Amy is now in a happy relationship with Jessie and wants a simple Christmas. However, her overly critical mother, Ruth, derails her plans, texting her that she is coming for the holidays. Meanwhile, Kiki is still overworked with her four kids but now her husband Kent is much more helpful. Kiki is surprised when her mother Sandy shows up earlier than expected and for three weeks, overwhelming her. Carla has her own issues as her mother, Isis, has arrived unexpectedly for the first time in years; despite Carla being happy to see Isis, she's well aware that she expects something out of it.

Amy, Kiki and Carla go to the mall and commiserate over the holidays. Complaining about the holiday pressure, they make a pact to "take Christmas back". Ruth tries to create a spectacle out of Christmas, rather than keeping it simple like Amy wants. Trying to tamp down those plans, Amy takes the family to Sky Zone to meet up with Kiki and Carla and their families. The grandmothers finally meet and chat.

At work, Carla meets erotic dancer Ty, who is in town competing in a Sexy Santa competition. He asks her to be his date, which she accepts enthusiastically. Kiki continues to have issues with her mother's overbearingness, so brings Sandy to Dr. Karl, to discuss it, end up having a communication breakdown; Kiki scolds her and Sandy leaves the session.

Amy and Kiki join Carla, attending the Sexy Santa show. Everyone is impressed with Ty's dancing. To everyone's surprise, Isis gets up on the bar and starts dancing with him. Carla runs up to get Ty back, leading to a fight. When Carla brings Isis home, she asks for money for a new investment; although Carla knows she's just going to gamble it away and then disappear as always, she loans her the money.

On Christmas Eve, Sandy tells Kiki she bought the house next door to live closer to her. Finally, Kiki lashes out, telling her she can't as she needs some space. Sandy leaves the room crying. At the same time, Amy gets angry with Ruth when she discovers she has invited strangers to her home for an elaborate Christmas party, exactly what Amy told her not to do. Realizing Ruth is only going through with this to make herself relevant rather than be there for her grandkids, Amy and Ruth then get into a fight and accidentally knock down a Christmas Tree, ruining the house. Enraged, Amy yells at Ruth to get out of her life forever. Her kids, Jane and Dylan, witness this outburst and, fearing they'll be next, become upset with Amy. Meanwhile, Carla finds a goodbye note from Isis.

Ruth goes to church for Midnight Mass, joined by Sandy and Isis. They criticize each other for their efforts as mothers, pointing out each other's flaws. Amy's father Hank talks to her about her horrible fight with her mom, where he reveals that Ruth, while difficult to deal with at times, is actually incredibly insecure and has always worried whether or not she was doing a good job as a mother, but has good intentions and loves Amy unconditionally.

Amy goes to the church where Ruth is to repair their relationship. They apologize, confessing how much they genuinely love each other. Ruth tells Amy that she is a wonderful mother. They embrace tightly. As the clock strikes midnight, Amy realizes that she needs her mother to help her fix Christmas, so they rush home to decorate the house properly.

On Christmas morning, Jane and Dylan come downstairs to see that Ruth has returned, the relationship has been repaired and the house looks wonderful. Kiki makes up with Sandy, who tells her she put the neighboring house on the market and admits that she has always felt lonely on Christmas since Kiki's father died. Carla is then visited by Isis, who is serious about turning her life around and has a new job at Sky Zone, though she confused as to how she passed the drug test.

All the families get together for an unorthodox Christmas dinner. Amy, Kiki, and Carla applaud each other for doing what they set out to do; Ty, who has legitimately fallen in love with Carla, tracks her to Amy's house to start a relationship with her; Ruth, Sandy and Isis announce that they have become friends and are now planning to take a trip to Las Vegas to see Wayne Newton (something Kiki had demanded Sandy do).

Cast

 Mila Kunis as Amy Redmond Mitchell
 Kathryn Hahn as Carla Dunkler
 Kristen Bell as Kiki Moore 
 Christine Baranski as Ruth Redmond
 Susan Sarandon as Isis Dunkler
 Cheryl Hines as Sandy Wilson
 Peter Gallagher as Hank Redmond
 Jay Hernandez as Jessie Harkness
 Justin Hartley as Ty 
 Lyle Brocato as Kent Moore
 Wanda Sykes as Dr. Elizabeth Karl
 Oona Laurence as Jane Mitchell
 Emjay Anthony as Dylan Mitchell
 Ariana Greenblatt as Lori Harkness
 Cade Cooksey as Jaxon Dunkler
 Jacks Dean as Bernard Moore
 Madison Muffley as Clare Moore
 Christina Applegate as Gwendolyn James
 Kenny G as himself

Production
In December 2016, it was announced that A Bad Moms Christmas would be released on November 3, 2017, and that it would be Christmas-themed, with Bell, Hahn, and Kunis returning to reprise their roles. The release date was subsequently moved up two days to November 1, 2017. In April 2017, Justin Hartley joined the cast of the film, and in May 2017, Susan Sarandon, Christine Baranski, and Cheryl Hines joined as the mothers' mothers, alongside Wanda Sykes and Jay Hernandez reprising their roles from the first film.

Principal photography on the film began in Atlanta, Georgia on May 1, 2017.

Release
A Bad Moms Christmas was released on Wednesday, November 1, 2017. It was originally scheduled for November 3, 2017, but was brought forward two days to avoid direct competition with Thor: Ragnarok.

In Australia, the film was released under the title Bad Moms 2.

Home media
The film was released by Universal Pictures Home Entertainment on DVD and Blu-ray on February 6, 2018, in the United States and Canada.

Reception

Box office
A Bad Moms Christmas grossed $72.1 million in the United States and Canada, and $58.5 million in other territories, for a worldwide total of $130.6 million, against a production budget of $28 million.

In North America, the film was projected to gross around $25 million from 3,615 theaters in its first five days (including $17 million over the weekend). It took in $2.7 million on its first day, and $17 million over the weekend, for a five-day total of $21.6 million, finishing second at the box office behind Thor: Ragnarok.

Critical response
The website's critical consensus reads, "Featuring twice the moms but roughly half the laughs, A Bad Moms Christmas is a slapdash holiday sequel that falls short of the original with a disappointing dearth of good cheer." On Metacritic, which assigns a normalized rating to reviews, the film has a weighted average score of 42 out of 100, based on 30 critics, indicating "mixed or average reviews". Audiences polled by CinemaScore gave the film an average grade of "B" on an A+ to F scale, down from the "A" earned by the first film, while PostTrak reported filmgoers gave it a "very low" 68% overall positive score.

Owen Gleiberman of Variety gave the film a mixed review, writing, "A Bad Moms Christmas should appeal to the same—dare I say it?—demo that Bad Moms did, even though it's not nearly as wild a comedy. It has one halfway original idea, which is that when you're a mom yourself, the ability of your own mom to drive you nuts is heightened to the third power, because you're competing on levels that are almost primal." Pete Hammond of Deadline Hollywood gave the film a positive review, calling it a "good time movie" and writing: "...it goes way over the top, but I have to confess I laughed—a lot—and that's obviously the point even if this is not critic's fodder or meant to be. Subtle this is not, but A Bad Moms Christmas is the perfect tonic to lift your spirits and forget your troubles in these dark times."

Sequel
In April 2019 during CinemaCon, it was announced that a sequel titled Bad Moms' Moms is in development. Sarandon, Baranski, and Hines will reprise their roles. In June 2021, it was reported that Bad Moms' Moms had been postponed due to the COVID-19 pandemic.

See also
 List of Christmas films

References

External links
 
 
 A Bad Moms Christmas on Rotten Tomatoes

2017 films
2010s English-language films
2017 comedy films
2010s buddy comedy films
2010s Christmas comedy films
2010s female buddy films
American buddy comedy films
American Christmas comedy films
American female buddy films
American sequel films
Films about dysfunctional families
Films directed by Jon Lucas and Scott Moore
Films produced by Suzanne Todd
Films scored by Christopher Lennertz
Films set in Chicago
Films shot in Atlanta
Films with screenplays by Jon Lucas and Scott Moore
Huayi Brothers films
STX Entertainment films
2010s American films